Stockton Heath is a civil parish located to the south of Warrington, Cheshire, England.  It was formerly a separate village but, with the growth of the town, it is now a suburb of Warrington.  It stands at the crossroads of the A49 and the A56 roads, and is traversed by the Bridgewater and the Manchester Ship Canals.  Stockton Heath contains 12 buildings that are recorded in the National Heritage List for England as designated listed buildings, all of which are listed at Grade II.  This grade is the lowest of the three gradings given to listed buildings and is applied to "buildings of national importance and special interest".

References
Citations

Sources

Listed buildings in Warrington
Lists of listed buildings in Cheshire